The OVO Hydro is a multi-purpose indoor arena located within the Scottish Event Campus in Glasgow, Scotland.

The arena was initially named The Hydro after its main sponsor Scottish Hydro Electric. The arena was known as The SSE Hydro until October 2021, when it was announced that the name was to change to "OVO Hydro", after its new sponsor OVO Energy, with a focus on making the venue more sustainable. The arena was officially opened on 30 September 2013, with a concert by Rod Stewart.

The OVO Hydro arena is located adjacent to the SEC Centre and the SEC Armadillo and hosts international musical stars, global entertainment and sporting events; with a maximum capacity of 14,300 and aims to attract one million visitors each year. The arena was the largest entertainment venue in Scotland, before the opening of Aberdeen's P&J Live in 2019, and the fifth largest in the UK.

History

Development and planning

Planning for The Hydro began some time in 2001 as the second redevelopment of the Queens Dock in Glasgow. In May 2003, a plan had been unveiled for an entertainment arena, holding 12,300 seated audience members and 2,000 standing.

London-based architects Foster + Partners were appointed as the design team for the Hydro in May 2004, with Glasgow-based Elphinsone additionally appointed as the preferred developer for the site. The design of the arena was finally released to the press in October 2005, and the SECC gained full planning consent for the arena by 2006.

Construction
Construction for the arena finally began in February 2011 by construction company Lend Lease. By November 2011, building work for the roof of the arena had begun, which was completed by April 2013. The arena's signature translucent outer cushions were installed in May 2013, along with the seating inside of the arena, marking construction of the arena completed, taking two years to complete.

2013 roof fire
At approximately 15:20 on Sunday 8 June 2013, flames were reported to be coming from the domed roof of the partially completed building.  40 firefighters from the Scottish Fire and Rescue Service attended the blaze. It was determined that the fire was caused by ongoing welding work on the building's roof. On 18 June, the venue's operator revealed that despite additional challenges, work on the venue was still on track for completion.

Events

Entertainment

Sports
On 14 December 2014, the BBC Sports Personality of the Year Award ceremony was held at the venue. During the 2014 Commonwealth Games the SSE Hydro was home to the netball and gymnastic events. On 18 July 2015, the UFC held their inaugural Scottish event UFC Fight Night: Bisping vs. Leites at the Hydro. From 23 October to 1 November 2015, the SSE Hydro hosted the Artistic gymnastics world championships.

In 2016, the venue hosted a heavyweight boxing fight between Dillian Whyte and Ian Lewison. Later it has hosted four boxing fights headlined by Scottish light welterweight boxer Josh Taylor. It also hosted two rounds of the 2018–19 World Boxing Super Series.

Filming location
The OVO Hydro was used for exterior shots of the venue for the fictional 2020 Eurovision Song Contest in the 2020 film Eurovision Song Contest: The Story of Fire Saga.

Politics
The OVO Hydro was host to the largest televised debate seen in Scotland's history, Scotland Decides: The Big, Big Debate, held on the evening of Thursday 11 September 2014; towards the end of the Scottish independence referendum campaign. The Mentorn/BBC Scotland organised debate, in which every secondary school in Scotland was invited to take part, involved around 7,500 first time voters and was broadcast on BBC One during the evening of 11 September 2014 and was presented by James Cook.

Ticket sales records
In 2016, the arena handled 751,487 ticket sales; making it the eighth-busiest music arena in the world in terms of ticket sales. It also hosted the UFC's first event in Scotland.

In 2019, the Hydro was the second busiest venue in the world behind Madison Square Garden in New York City. The venue attracts over 1 million visitors per year, making it a regular feature in the top ten arenas globally.

References

External links

 

2013 establishments in Scotland
2014 Commonwealth Games venues
2018 European Championships venues
Boxing venues in Scotland
Culture in Glasgow
Darts venues
Exhibition and conference centres in Scotland
Foster and Partners buildings
Gymnastics venues
Indoor arenas in Scotland
Music venues completed in 2013
Music venues in Glasgow
Netball venues in Scotland
Sports venues completed in 2013
Sports venues in Glasgow